Saururus chinensis, commonly known as Asian lizard's tail, is an herb that grows in low, damp places to more than 1 meter high, endemic to China, India, Japan (including the Ryukyu Islands), Korea, Philippines, and Vietnam. Its leaves are green, papery, ribbed, densely glandular, and ovate to ovate-lanceolate, and (4-)10-20 × (2-)5-10 cm in size. Each flower spike resembles a lizard's tail.

Traditional medical uses
Saururus chinensis been used to treat inflammation in diverse conditions such as edema, gonorrhea, and asthma.

Research
Many studies have reported that the ethanol extract of S. chinensis Baill (SC-E) can decrease the inflammation by inhibiting the intracellular nitric oxide, prostaglandin E2, and various inflammatory cytokines released by lipopolysaccharide stimulation of raw 264.7 macrophages. Saururus chinensis also regulate blood lipid level in animal model and suppress the activity of α-glucosidase for the anti-diabetic effect.

References

References Unsorted

 Baillon, H.E. 1871. Adansonia 10: 71.
 Missouri Botanical Garden
 Plants for a Future

Saururaceae
Taxa named by Henri Ernest Baillon
Taxa named by João de Loureiro